Robert Moynihan is the founding editor of Inside the Vatican magazine, a journal on Church and world affairs.

Education
He obtained  his B.A. in English from Harvard University, where he graduated magna cum laude. He later received his Ph.D. in medieval history from the Yale University. His thesis was The Influence of Joachim of Fiore on the Early Franciscans: A Study of the Commentary Super Hieremiam. He also received a Diploma in Latin Letters from Gregorian University in Rome.

Personal
He currently lives in Annapolis, Maryland. Moynihan is fluent in five different languages.

Career
Moynihan is founder and editor-in-chief of the Inside the Vatican. He frequently speaks on Catholic issues and has appeared on a number of media outlets which include: Fox News, CNN, ABC, EWTN and many others .

Books
The Spiritual Vision of Pope Benedict XVI: Let God’s Light Shine Forth
Pray for Me: The Life and Spiritual vision of Pope Francis
Finding Viganò
The first Pope from the Americas

References

External links
Robert Moynihan, Ph.D. at Random House
Fatima Questions

Living people
American editors
Harvard University alumni
Yale University alumni
Year of birth missing (living people)
Editors of Catholic publications